Ripley County Courthouse may refer to:

 Ripley County Courthouse (Indiana)
 Ripley County Courthouse (Missouri)